Fortress America may refer to:

 Fortress America (board game), a strategic board game designed by Michael Gray
 Fortress North America, the defense of Canada and the United States against their enemies if the rest of the world were lost to them